Vanab may refer to:

Vanab, Lorestan
Vanab, Zanjan